Dindicodes leopardinata is a moth of the family Geometridae first described by Frederic Moore in 1868. It is found in northern India.

References

Moths described in 1868
Pseudoterpnini